Marianne is a female name. It is the French version of the Greek Mariamne, which is a variant of Mary, ultimately from the Hebrew Miriam (מִרְיָם Miryám), Mirjam (Aramaic: Mariam). In late Greek Marianna (Μαριάννα) was used.

In 18th century France Marianne became a popular name as a variant of Marian, Marie. It can also be seen as a combination of Marie and Anne. It gave inspiration to several double names such as Marie-Anne, Anne-Marie as well as other variants such as Anna Maria, Ana-Maria and Marianna and alternate spellings Mary Ann and Mary Anne. The combination of the two names has also been popular with Christians because Saint Anne is traditionally the name of the mother of the Virgin Mary.

People with the given name Marianne
 Marianne, Princess zu Sayn-Wittgenstein-Sayn (born 1919), German noble
 Marianne Ackerman (born 1952), Canadian novelist, playwright, and journalist
 Marianne Berndt, shot putter and discus thrower
 Marianne Bigum (born 1983), Danish politician
 Marianne Clausen (1947–2014), Danish musicologist and choir conductor
 Marianne Cope (1838–1918), German-born American nun
 Marianne Davies, musician
 Marianne Dickerson, long-distance runner
 Marianne Dubois (born 1957), French politician
 Marianne Ehrmann, novelist
 Marianne Ehrenström, artist
 Marianne Fay, American economist and writer
 Marianne Faithfull, singer
 Marianne Fredriksson, author
 Marianne Fundahn (born 1967), Swedish politician
 Marianne Githens, political scientist, feminist, and author
 Marianne Golz, opera singer and World War II resistance member
 Marianne Jean-Baptiste, actress
 Marianne W. Lewis, Dean of the Cass Business School.
 Marianne Limpert, swimmer
 Marianne Löfgren, actor
 Marianne Lundquist (1931–2020), Swedish swimmer
 Marianne Moore, American poet
 Marianne Muis, swimmer
 Marianne Pettersen, Norwegian footballer
 Marianne Rendón, American actress
 Marianne Rosenberg, singer 
 Marianne Steinbrecher, volleyball player
 Marianne Timmer, speed skater
 Marianne Vaatstra (1982-1999), Dutch murder victim
 Marianne von Martines
 Marianne von Werefkin, painter
 Marianne Vos, road-, track- and cross-cyclist
 Marianne Williamson (born 1952), activist, humanitarian, entrepreneur and candidate for President of the United States in 2020

People with the given name Mariane 
 Mariane Pearl, French journalist
 Mariane Amaro, French-Portuguese football defender
 Mariane Chan, Hong Kong actress
 Mariane van Hogendorp, Dutch feminist
 A character in Tartuffe, a comedy by Molière

People with the given name Marianna
 Marianna Efstratiou, Greek singer
 Marianna Hill, American actress
 Marianna Kambouroglou, Greek folklorist
 Marianna Lubomirska, Polish noble
 Marianna Lymperta, Greek swimmer
 Marianna Malińska, Polish ballerina
 Marianna Spring, British journalist 
 Marianna Vardinoyannis, Greek UNESCO ambassador
 Marianna Zachariadi, Greek pole vaulter
 Marianna Zorba, Greek singer

Fictional characters
 Marianne, a character in the light novel series Shakugan no Shana
 Marianne, the protagonist of a trilogy of novels by Sheri S. Tepper
 Marianne, the protagonist of musical fantasy film Strange Magic
 Marianne vi Britannia from the anime and manga series Code Geass
 Marianne Bryant, played by Amanda Bynes in the film Easy A
 Marianne Dashwood, in Jane Austen's novel Sense and Sensibility
 Marianne von Edmund, a character from the video game Fire Emblem: Three Houses
 Marianne Lane, played by Tilda Swinton in A Bigger Splash
 Marianne Sheridan, the protagonist of the Irish novel Normal People
 Marianne Thornberry, from animated television series The Wild Thornberrys
 Marianne, a character in the film Portrait of a Lady on Fire

See also 
 Maryanne, given name
 Marianna (disambiguation)
 Mariana (disambiguation)

Notes

Dutch feminine given names
Feminine given names
English feminine given names
French feminine given names
German feminine given names
Greek feminine given names
Scandinavian feminine given names
Swedish feminine given names
Norwegian feminine given names
Icelandic feminine given names
Finnish feminine given names
Danish feminine given names
Swiss feminine given names